Adrien André (29 May 1884, in La Bussière, Vienne – 22 April 1965) was a French politician. He represented the Independent Radicals in the Chamber of Deputies from 1928 to 1936 and in the Senate from 1936 to 1940. On 10 July 1940, he voted in favour of granting the cabinet presided by Philippe Pétain authority to draw up a new constitution, thereby effectively ending the French Third Republic and establishing Vichy France. Between 1951 and 1958, he was a member of the National Assembly as a Radical Party representative.

References

1884 births
1965 deaths
People from Vienne
Politicians from Nouvelle-Aquitaine
Independent Radical politicians
Radical Party (France) politicians
Members of the 14th Chamber of Deputies of the French Third Republic
Members of the 15th Chamber of Deputies of the French Third Republic
French Senators of the Third Republic
Senators of Vienne
Deputies of the 2nd National Assembly of the French Fourth Republic
Deputies of the 3rd National Assembly of the French Fourth Republic